Haitham Mohammed Ali Abu Hawi Asiri (born 25 March 2001) is a Saudi Arabian professional footballer who plays as a winger for Al-Ahli and the Saudi Arabia national team.

Career statistics

Club

Notes

International
Scores and results list Saudi Arabia's goal tally first.

Honours

International
Saudi Arabia U-23
AFC U-23 Asian Cup: 2022

References

External links
 

2001 births
Living people
People from 'Asir Province
Saudi Arabian footballers
Saudi Arabia youth international footballers
Saudi Arabia international footballers
Association football wingers
Saudi Professional League players
Saudi First Division League players
Al-Ahli Saudi FC players
2022 FIFA World Cup players